The Hymenopteran superfamily of parasitoid wasps, Platygastroidea, has often been treated as a lineage within the superfamily Proctotrupoidea, but most classifications since 1977 have recognized it as an independent group within the Proctotrupomorpha. It is presently has some 4000 described species. They are exclusively parasitic in nature. 

The family Scelionidae was briefly considered to be a subfamily of the Platygastridae, though subsequent analyses have reversed this decision. Chen et al (2021) recognizes eight families, including five new extant families (Geoscelionidae, Janzenellidae, Neuroscelionidae, Nixoniidae, and Sparasionidae) and one extinct family †Proterosceliopsidae, known from fossils found in Cretaceous amber. Members of the group are known from the Early Cretaceous to present. The ancestral hosts of the group are orthopterans, with various lineages switching hosts to other insects.

References

External links 
Bugguide.net. Superfamily Platygastroidea

 
Apocrita superfamilies